Stan Shaw (born July 14, 1952) is an American actor.

Early life 
Born in Chicago, Illinois, he is the son of Bertha Shaw and saxophonist Eddie Shaw, and cousin of the late soul singers Sam Cooke and Tyrone Davis. His brother is Vaan Shaw, a guitarist. He is married to Dr. Zoe Shaw, who is an author and psychotherapist.

Career
Shaw started his acting career in the Chicago production of the musical Hair as well as the Broadway production of The Me Nobody Knows. His last Broadway show, Via Galactica was directed by Peter Hall.

Before becoming an actor, Shaw was a karate, judo, and jujutsu instructor in Chicago. He holds first dan black belt in judo and jujutsu and a second dan in karate. Shaw appears in The Bingo Long Traveling All-Stars & Motor Kings in 1976 as Esquire Joe Calloway. Shaw appears also in Rocky (1976) as Dipper, a rival boxer who taunts Rocky after being given his locker. He also played a professional fighter in Tough Enough (1983), Harlem Nights (1989), and Snake Eyes (1998).

One of his most notable roles was his appearance as Alex Haley's maternal grandfather Will Palmer in the 1979 miniseries Roots: The Next Generations. Another notable role was Private Washington in The Boys in Company C (1978). Shaw also plays Toomer Smalls in The Great Santini (1979). After a part in the 1991 film Fried Green Tomatoes, he had a role in the 1995 comedy Houseguest, alongside Sinbad, and appeared as a pirate in Cutthroat Island (1995) with Geena Davis. He appeared as George Tyrell in the 1996 disaster film Daylight and as Archie Mullen in the film Freedom Song (2000).

Shaw's television credits include episodes of Starsky & Hutch, The Moneychangers, Matlock, The Young Riders, Hill Street Blues, Murder, She Wrote, The X-Files, and a 2009 episode of CSI. He had a regular role in the 1983 TV series The Mississippi.  He also appeared as Isaac in the miniseries North and South.

Shaw is working on a film project, Gargoyle Bob, with Vincent Ho and Ted Boonthanakit. They plan to also create a graphic novel of the story.

Partial filmography

 1974 Truck Turner as Fontana
 1974 TNT Jackson as Charlie
 1975 Darktown Strutters as "Raunchy"
 1976 The Bingo Long Traveling All-Stars & Motor Kings as Joseph Vanderbilt "Esquire Joe" Callaway, An All-Star (CF)
 1976 Rocky as Dipper "Big Dipper" Brown
 1978 The Boys in Company C as Tyrone Washington
 1979 The Great Santini as Toomer Smalls
 1979 Roots: The Next Generations as Will Palmer
 1983 Tough Enough as P.T. Coolidge
 1984 Runaway as Sergeant Marvin James
 1986 The Gladiator as Joe Barker
 1986 Busted Up as Angie
 1987 The Monster Squad as Detective Rich Sapir
 1987 Billionaire Boys Club as Frank Booker
 1989 Harlem Nights as Jack Jenkins
 1990 Fear as Detective Webber
 1991 Fried Green Tomatoes as George "Big George"
 1993 Body of Evidence as Charles Biggs
 1993 Rising Sun as Phillips
 1995 Houseguest as Larry, The Tattoo Artist
 1995 Cutthroat Island as Mr. Glasspoole
 1996 Daylight as George Tyrell
 1998 Snake Eyes as Lincoln "The Atlantic City Executioner" Tyler
 2000 Freedom Song as Archie Mullen
 2003 Detonator as Robert Brickland
 2016 Cassidy Way as Mr. Kane
 2017 Jeepers Creepers 3 as Sheriff Dan Tashtego
 2019 A Christmas Winter Song as Fred (main character)
 2020 The Pale Door as Lester
 2021 Greyson Family Christmas as Dr. Greyson
 2022 A Christmas Prayer as Deacon Williams

References

External links

1952 births
Living people
American male film actors
American male stage actors
American male judoka
American jujutsuka
American male karateka
Male actors from Illinois
African-American male actors
American male television actors
21st-century African-American people
20th-century African-American people